The 1970–71 South Pacific cyclone season, in terms of severe tropical cyclones, was the least active season on record, with none of its six storms strengthening above Category 2 tropical cyclone intensity. It was a below average season, beginning late and ending early. The season officially began on November 15 and ended on April 30, but the first storm formed a month after that, on December 15.


Seasonal summary

Systems

Tropical Cyclone Priscilla 

Over the next day, the system drifted westwards, before it started to move southwards and intensify further. The system subsequently became equivalent to a modern-day category 1 tropical cyclone, with 10-minute sustained wind speeds of 75 km/h (45 mph) during December 17. The system was last noted during the next day, after it had moved below 25S and out of the tropics. It was thought that the system caused gale-force winds in parts of Viti Levu, Vatulele, Kandavu and the Yasawa and Mamanutha group of islands.

Tropical Cyclone Rosie 

Cyclone Rosie was a weak cyclone which existed in late December 1970 near New Caledonia.

Tropical Cyclone Ida 

Cyclone Ida existed from 16 to 22 February 1971 in the Coral Sea.

Tropical Cyclone Fiona 

Cyclone Fiona existed from 16 to 28 February 1971. It developed from remains of Cyclone Gertie, which was located in the Gulf of Carpentaria.

Tropical Cyclone Lena 

Cyclone Lena existed from 13 to 20 March 1971 near New Caledonia.

Other systems 
Tropical Depression Nora caused minor damage and gale-force winds over the Yasawa and Mamanuca islands, Viti-Levu as well as the Lomaiviti Islands, when it impacted Fiji between October 29–30.

Cyclone Dora formed in the Coral Sea east of Proserpine on February 10, 1971. It took a southeasterly track over the next four days, away from the Queensland coast, turning into a low pressure system well east of the Queensland/New South Wales border. On February 17, the system reintensified into a cyclone east of the Gold Coast, and it crossed the Queensland coast north of Brisbane at Redcliffe. Widespread structural damage was reported, with numerous power lines falling and roofs being uproofed.

During March 8, Tropical Cyclone Thelma impacted Western and Southwestern Fiji and caused flooding in Ba.

Seasonal effects

See also 

 Atlantic hurricane seasons: 1970, 1971
 Eastern Pacific hurricane seasons: 1970, 1971
 Western Pacific typhoon seasons: 1970, 1971
 North Indian Ocean cyclone seasons: 1970, 1971

References

External links 

 
South Pacific cyclone seasons
Articles which contain graphical timelines